Cox College is a private college associated with the CoxHealth System in Springfield, Missouri.

History
The college was established in 1907 as Burge Deaconess Training School. In 2019, the college received approval from the Missouri State Board of Nursing to expand it's nursing class size from  250 to 400 students in anticipation of its completion of a $6.6 million renovation of the main campus in Springfield, making it the second largest nursing program in the state. In addition to expanding the main campus, Cox College also announced it would be creating satellite campuses in Branson and Monett that would offer Associate of Science in Nursing that would open in 2021.  As of 2021, it had an enrollment of 727 undergraduate students.

Academics
The College offers the following programs:
 Associate of Science in Nursing
 Bachelor of Science in Nursing
 Master of Science in Nursing
 Master of Science in Nutrition Diagnostics
 Master of Science in Occupational Therapy
 Bachelor of Science in Diagnostic Imaging
 Associate of Science in Radiography
 Associate of Science in Medical Assisting

References 

1907 establishments in Missouri
Educational institutions established in 1907
Nursing schools in Missouri
Private universities and colleges in Missouri
Universities and colleges in Springfield, Missouri